BlueView Technologies, Inc is an American electrical equipment company based in Seattle, Washington. That designs, develops and sells advanced Sonar Systems that can be currently deployed on AUV's, ROV's, surface vessels, fixed positions, and portable platforms. The company provides products for the Navy, Coast Guard, and port authorities, among other law-enforcing marine centric organisations, the necessary facilities to see underwater.

BlueView was founded in 2005 by Lee Thompson, Jason Seawall, and Scott Bachelor. It was acquired by Teledyne Technologies in 2012.

To date, more than 500 BlueView systems are installed worldwide. Teledyne BlueView's sonar systems are currently deployed on AUVs, ROVs, surface vessels, fixed positions, and portable platforms.

References 

Electrical wiring and construction supplies manufacturers
Manufacturing companies based in Seattle
Teledyne Technologies